Chenar Gerit (also Romanized as Chenār Gerīt and Chenār-e Gerīt; also known as Chenār Gerīk, Chenār, and Chenār Khoshkeh) is a village in Gerit Rural District, Papi District, Khorramabad County, Lorestan Province, Iran. At the 2006 census, its population was 263, in 58 families.

References 

Towns and villages in Khorramabad County